Afrikaans has a similar phonology to other West Germanic languages, especially Dutch.

Vowels

Afrikaans has an extensive vowel inventory consisting of 17 vowel phonemes, among which there are 10 monophthongs and 7 diphthongs. There are also 7 marginal monophthongs.

Monophthongs

The phonetic quality of the close vowels
  tends to be merged with  into .
Thus, it is sometimes transcribed .

The phonetic quality of the mid vowels
  vary between mid  or close-mid .
However, other scholars do not distinguish between stressed and unstressed schwas. This article uses the symbol  regardless of the exact height of the vowel.
Phonetically,  have been variously described as mid  and open-mid .
  are rather weakly rounded, and many speakers merge  with  into , even in formal speech. The merger has been noted in colloquial speech since the 1920s.

The phonetic quality of the open vowels
 In some words such as vanaand  'this evening; tonight', unstressed  is actually a schwa , not .
  is open near-front , but older sources describe it as near-open central  and open central .
  is either open near-back  or open back . Especially in stressed positions, the back realization may be rounded , and sometimes it may be even as high as the  phoneme. The rounded realization is associated with younger white speakers, especially female speakers of northern accents.

Other notes
 As phonemes,  and  occur only in the words spieël  'mirror' and koeël  'bullet', which used to be pronounced with sequences  and  respectively.
 Close vowels are phonetically long before .
  contrasts with  only in the minimal pair pers  'press' – pêrs  'purple'.
  occur only in a few words.
 As a phoneme,  occurs only in some loanwords from English, such as pêl  'pal', or as a dialectal allophone of  before , most commonly in the former Transvaal and Free State provinces.
This article uses .
This article uses the former symbol.
 In some words, such as hamer, short  is in free variation with long  despite the fact that the spelling suggests the latter. In some words, such as laat (vb. 'let'), the pronunciation with short  occurs only in colloquial language, to distinguish from homophones (laat, adj. 'late'). In some other words, such as aan 'on', the pronunciation with short  is already a part of the standard language. The shortening of  has been noted as early as 1927.

Nasalized vowels
In some instances of the postvocalic sequence ,  is realized as nasalisation (and lengthening, if the vowel is short) of the preceding monophthong, which is stronger in some speakers than others, but there also are speakers retaining  as well as the original length of the preceding vowel.
In monosyllabic words, that is the norm.
In less common words (such as Italiaans, meaning Italian),  is the usual pronunciation.

 analyze the pre- sequences  as phonemic short vowels  and note that this process of nasalising the vowel and deleting the nasal occurs in many dialects of Dutch as well, such as The Hague dialect.

Diphthongs

 Some sources prescribe monophthongal  realizations of these; that is at least partially outdated:
 There is not a complete agreement about the realisation of :
The unrounded onset is a rather recent development and is not described by older sources. The monophthongal realisation  is virtually nonexistent.
 There is not a complete agreement about the realisation of 
 Falling diphthongs. Their first element may be short  or somewhat lengthened .
 Rising diphthongs . These variants do not seem to appear word-finally.
 Phonetically disyllabic sequences of two short monophthongs , which may occur in all environments.
 Monophthongs, either short  or somewhat lengthened . The monophthongal realisations occur in less stressed words as well as in stressed syllables in words that have more than one syllable. In the latter case, they are in free variation with all of the three diphthongal realisations.
Historically, these were pronounced with a disyllabic sequence  and so reël used to be pronounced .

Other diphthongs
 The scholar Daan Wissing argues that  is not a phonetically correct transcription and that  is more accurate.
 Most often,  has an unrounded offset. For some speakers, the onset is also unrounded.
  occur mainly in loanwords.
 Older sources describe  as a narrow back diphthong . However, newer sources describe its onset as more front.
That happens because Afrikaans  is more similar to the usual South African realization of English .

Long diphthongs

'False' diphthongs
In diminutives ending in  formed to monosyllabic nouns, the vowels  are realised as closing diphthongs .

 In practice, the diphthong  is realised the same as the phonemic diphthong .
This means that puntjie 'point' sounds somewhat different than puintjie 'rubble'.

Consonants

Obstruents
  are bilabial, whereas  are labiodental.
 According to some authors,  is actually an approximant .
  are unaspirated.
  may be somewhat more front before front vowels; the fronted allophone of  also occurs in diminutives ending in -djie and -tjie.
  occur only in loanwords.
  is most often uvular, either a fricative,  or a voiceless trill , the latter especially in initial position before a stressed vowel. The uvular fricative is also used by many speakers of white South African English as a realisation of the marginal English phoneme . In Afrikaans, velar  may be used in a few "hyper-posh" varieties  , and it may also, rarely, occur as an allophone before front vowels in speakers with otherwise uvular .
 /w/ occurs frequently as an allophone of /v/ after other obstruents, such as in kwaad ('angry').

Sonorants
  is bilabial.
  merges with  before labial consonants. Phonetically, this merged consonant is realized as bilabial  before , and labiodental  before .
 merges with  before dorsals.
  is velarised  in all positions, especially noticeably non-prevocalically.
  is usually an alveolar trill  or tap . In some parts of the former Cape Province, it is realised uvularly, either as a trill  or a fricative . The uvular trill may also be pronounced as a tap .

See also
 Dutch phonology
 Afrikaans - Dutch Phonology Comparison Chart (Open Learning Environment)

References

Bibliography

Further reading

 
 
 
 
 
 
 
 
 
 
 

Phonology
Germanic phonologies